Sic transit gloria mundi is a Latin phrase that means "Thus passes the glory of the world."

Origin
The phrase was used in the ritual of papal coronation ceremonies between 1409 (when it was used at the coronation of Alexander V) and 1963. As the newly chosen pope proceeded from the sacristy of St. Peter's Basilica in his sedia gestatoria, the procession stopped three times.

On each occasion, a papal master of ceremonies would fall to his knees before the pope, holding a silver or brass reed, bearing a tow of smoldering flax. For three times in succession, as the cloth burned away, he would say in a loud and mournful voice, "Pater Sancte, sic transit gloria mundi!" ("Holy Father, so passes worldly glory!"). These words, thus addressed to the pope, served as a reminder of the transitory nature of life and earthly honours.

A form of the phrase appeared in Thomas à Kempis's 1418 work The Imitation of Christ: "" ("How quickly the glory of the world passes away").

In idiomatic contexts, the phrase has been used to mean "fame is fleeting".

In popular culture
 The lead character played by Goldie Hawn in the 1978 movie Foul Play is named Gloria Mundy. 

 In Happy Days' Season 4, Episode 14 (A Shot in the Dark (1977)), the Fonz uses the phrase to simultaneously harken to his habit of adding "-amundo" to the end of anything; console Richie for a bad shot in a basketball game; and to offer to his date (who was formerly a member of the rival team's date) "that is a Latin phrase; means you're going to stay at my place, at least 'til Monday." 
 The phrase was referenced by Ritchie in the second episode of the drama It's a Sin. He says "We've got Gloria Monday literally in sick transit" after Gregory "Gloria" Finch visits after falling ill.
 The phrase was used to comic effect in a scene in the 1998 film Rushmore, "Sic transit gloria... Glory fades" delivered by Max Fischer, the film's protagonist.
 The phrase was also the title of the first-season finale of the drama series Yellowjackets.
 The phrase was used in the 1964 film The Masque of the Red Death, delivered by the Red Death.
 In the 1959 book A Canticle for Leibowitz, as a second nuclear armageddon is breaking in the 38th century, one of the monks mutters, "Sic transit mundus", or "So passes the world" prior to departing Earth.
 In July 2022, Jacob Rees-Mogg used this phrase during an interview with Channel 4's Krishnan Guru-Murthy and translated it as "so perishes the glory of the world".
 "Sic Transit Gloria... Glory Fades" is the second track on the 2003 album Deja Entendu by emo/post-hardcore band Brand New. The song was the second single released from Deja Entendu and began receiving radio play on November 18, 2003.
 American poet Emily Dickinson's first published poem was titled "Sic Transit Gloria Mundi." It was published in the Springfield Daily Republican newspaper on February 20, 1852. It was later republished in the poetry collection The Complete Poems of Emily Dickinson, edited by Thomas H. Johnson.
 An 1819 etching by British illustrator George Cruikshank is titled "The Sailors Progress: Sic transit gloria mundi."

See also 
Memento mori
This too shall pass
Vanitas
In ictu oculi, the companion painting to Finis gloriae mundi

References

External links

Latin religious words and phrases
Latin mottos
Destiny
Change